The North Carolina Mr. Basketball honor recognizes the top boys’ high school senior basketball player in the state of North Carolina. The award is presented annually by the Charlotte Observer.

Award winners

Schools with multiple winners

See also
 North Carolina Miss Basketball

References

Mr. and Miss Basketball awards
High school sports in North Carolina
Awards established in 1985
1985 establishments in North Carolina
Mr. Basketball
Mr. Basketball